D-No Entertainment is a small film production company founded in 2001.

Before D-No
D-No Entertainment founders producer Darlene Caamaño and manager Noah Rosen have worked individually in the entertainment industry for several years, and played a role in the sale, development and/or production of a number of projects.

These include best-selling films for companies including Buena Vista, DreamWorks, DreamWorks Animation and Miramax (on films such as Shrek, The Prince of Egypt, Antz, Chicken Run, Inspector Gadget and Frida). Among their smaller projects, the two count involvement in My Big Fat Greek Wedding, Saving Grace and Leopold Bloom.

Formation and properties
Founded in September 2001 by producer Darlene Caamaño (by then married to Mark Stephen Loquet) and manager Noah Rosen, Los Angeles-based D-No Entertainment is "a management/production company dedicated to the representation of Latin talent, and the production of their material." The two developed a number of properties, including Next Door for New Line Cinema, Love Simple for Paramount, On 2 with Miramax, Phoenix Pictures' Jumped In. In February, 2002, the D-No/Rosen-managed writers Keith Mitchell and Allie Dvorian announced that they were developing a project for Disney about Peter Westbrook, the only black man "ever to win an Olympic medal for fencing." In 2003, D-No started representing Australian writer Ben Blanks, after he was referred by Rudy Scalese.

D-No sold projects by the Latin writing team of Lalo Lopez and Esteban Zul (of Pocho Productions), which included Taco Truck The Movie, sold to New Line Cinema, Lowriders, bought by Twentieth Century Fox, College RoadTrip (with MTV), The Chuco Brothers, a Disney-purchased animated television series and Last Night in East L.A., an independent film starring Jay Hernandez, Aimee Garcia and Joy Enriquez.

In July 2003, D-No Entertainment (with Metrostop Entertainment) "established a relationship" with Bob Layton, David Michelinie and Dick Giordano's Future Comics comic book publishing company to adapt their properties (in particular Freemind and Deathmask) for the big or small screen.

As many of these projects either remain "in development," or have fallen by the wayside, D-No's best known property in one developed for many years, but only released in 2007. Caamaño-Loquet and Rosen share the executive producer credit on Dan in Real Life, which they developed and sold to Walt Disney Pictures. Starring Steve Carell and Juliette Binoche, the film was released by Touchstone in 2007.

Remake rights
In November 2002, D-No hired Mariana Sanchez to "bring talent and projects from Latin America and Spain into the company." Sanchez, and her 2001 Argentina-based company, Republica Productions helped D-No option remake rights to Alejandro Agresti's A Night With Sabrina Love (2000), and Argentinian TV series El Garante, as well as director Rodrigo Grande. D-No also acquired foreign remake rights to the 1982 Adolfo Aristarain-directed Argentinian thriller Last Days of the Victim, Spanish hit 13 Chimes, German rom-com Just the Beginning and Chilean comic book Angel Negro.

Post-D-No 
Caamaño Loquet subsequently ran Voy LLC, a distribution company dealing in "culturally relevant entertainment" for English-speaking Latinos, and she is currently President of Nala Films developing various projects for film and television. She was involved as a producer on a number of films during 2007 (notably In the Valley of Elah), with several more in production. Rosen, after sharing credit on Dan in Real Life also has a number of properties in development.

References 

Film production companies of the United States
Companies based in Los Angeles County, California